Marketable title (real estate) is a title that a court of equity considers to be so free from defect that it will legally force its acceptance by a buyer.  Marketable title does not assume that absolute absence of defect, but rather a title that a prudent, educated buyer in the reasonable course of business would accept.  For real estate practitioners, the most complete reference to title issues is found in the preprinted wording contained within an agreement/contract. If you cannot produce a clear title of deed to the property then the prospective buyer should expect to lose in a specific performance action. 

Merchantable title and marketable title are synonymous terms.

In the absence of an agreement to the contrary, there is an implied undertaking in the contract that the vendor (person selling the property) has a marketable title.  The contract typically provides that on failure of a vendor to deliver good and marketable title, the vendee (buyer) may rescind the contract and recover any deposit.

Merger

If a deed is delivered and it has no warranty of title, the buyer has no recourse because the deed supersedes the contract.  This means that the initial contract is no longer in effect.

Closing date
Sellers only have to tender good and marketable title on the date the conveyance is executed (date of closing).  So a seller may contract to sell property it does not currently possess.  Liability will be imposed on the seller for breach only if the seller does not have good and marketable title on the date of closing.

Defects that make title unmarketable
 Outstanding mortgages/liens
 Restrictive covenants
 Outstanding future interests of others in the property, i.e. a "reverter".
 Encumbrances
 Easements on the property
 Variations in the names of grantors and grantees
 Variations in the chain of title
 Outstanding dower interests.
 Adverse possession claims
 Structural encroachments
 Existing violations of an equitable servitude or covenant
 Zoning restriction violations

Actions that do not defeat marketability
 Zoning restrictions (so long as there are no current violations of the restrictions)
 Other land use regulations

Real property law